Hafsanur Sancaktutan (born 20 March 2000) is a Turkish actress.

Life and career 
Hafsanur Sancaktutan was born in Istanbul in 2000 . Her paternal family is of Laz descent from Rize. Her maternal family immigrated from Batumi, Adjara. Sancaktutan became interested in acting at a young age and started her career on stage. For her role in a number of theatrical adaptations, she received numerous local awards. 

She made her television debut in 2018 with a recurring role in the TV series Gülperi as Fidan. In 2019, she was cast in a leading role in the series Aşk Ağlatır, portraying the character of "Ada Meryem Varlı". In 2021, she starred in the series Son Yaz as Yağmur Kara, which premiered on Fox.

Filmography

Theatre

Awards and nominations

References

External links 
 
 

2000 births
Living people
Actresses from Istanbul
Turkish television actresses
21st-century Turkish actresses